Avika Gor (born 30 June 1997) is an Indian actress who works predominantly in Hindi television and Telugu films. She is famously known for playing the role of Anandi in Balika Vadhu and Roli in Sasural Simar Ka. She made her Telugu film debut with Uyyala Jampala (2013), for which she won SIIMA Award for Best Female Debut (Telugu). She went on to star in  successful films including Cinema Choopistha Mava, Care of Footpath 2, Ekkadiki Pothavu Chinnavada, Raju Gari Gadhi 3 and Net. She also appeared as the lead in TV show Laado – Veerpur Ki Mardani. In 2019, Gor was a contestant on Fear Factor: Khatron Ke Khiladi 9.

Early life and career
Avika Gor was born 30 June 1997 in Mumbai, Maharashtra. She attended Sharon English High School in the Mulund suburb of Mumbai.

She made her Hindi television debut with Ssshhhh...Koi Hai in 2007. She made her film debut in  Tollywood  with Uyyala Jampala in 2013 and won SIIMA Award for Best Female Debut (Telugu) at 3rd South Indian International Movie Awards for her role.

Filmography

Television

Films

Short films

Music videos

Awards and nominations

See also
 List of Indian television actresses

References

External links
 
 
 

Living people
1997 births
Actresses from Mumbai
Gujarati people
Indian child actresses
Indian film actresses
Indian television actresses
Indian television child actresses
Indian soap opera actresses
Actresses in Hindi cinema
Actresses in Telugu cinema
Actresses in Kannada cinema
Actresses in Hindi television
Indian expatriates in Kazakhstan
South Indian International Movie Awards winners
Fear Factor: Khatron Ke Khiladi participants
21st-century Indian child actresses
21st-century Indian actresses